Colin Marshall (born 1 November 1969) is a Scottish former professional footballer. He made appearances in the football league for Barnsley, and also whilst on loan at Wrexham and Scarborough.

References

1969 births
Living people
Scottish footballers
Association football forwards
Barnsley F.C. players
Wrexham A.F.C. players
Scarborough F.C. players
VfB Wissen players
TuS Koblenz players